"Whatever" is a song by the English rock band Oasis. Written by the band's lead guitarist, Noel Gallagher, it was released on 18 December 1994 as the band's first non-album single. A subsequent lawsuit awarded a co-writing credit to Neil Innes.

History
At six minutes and twenty-one seconds, "Whatever" was the longest single the band had released up to that point (it was later surpassed by "Champagne Supernova"). The song follows an AB structure, which differs from Verse-Chorus, as the main hook occurs at the beginning of the song. The song suddenly changes key during the bridge, before returning to the main chord progression of the song, which repeats for a two-and-a-half-minute outro in which, one by one, each instrument cuts out until only the strings are playing. Finally, the song ends with an extended, recorded applause track.

The Christmas single was released in 1994 as a stand-alone single, bridging the gap between Oasis' debut album, Definitely Maybe, and their second album, (What's the Story) Morning Glory?. "Whatever" entered the UK Singles Chart at number 3. The single was later included on the compilation album Time Flies... 1994–2009. The strings were played by the London Session Orchestra which featured former Electric Light Orchestra violinist Wilfred Gibson. The orchestration was arranged by Nick Ingman and Noel Gallagher.

"Whatever" has sold 540,000 copies to date. The song re-entered the UK Singles Chart on 20 June 2010 at number 64, due to the release of Time Flies, and was the first time that it had been available to purchase as a music download.

The song has been used by Coca-Cola in its 2012 campaign celebrating its 125th anniversary and also in Italian Vodafone commercials. It was also used by Asahi Breweries for their Asahi Off beer commercials in Japan.

Authorship dispute
English musician Neil Innes sued the band claiming the song borrowed portions of his song "How Sweet to Be an Idiot". Innes and Oasis settled a plagiarism lawsuit and Innes received songwriting credit. The portion of the melodic line in question are the eight notes that accompany the lyrics "How Sweet to be an Idiot"/"I'm free to be whatever I" of the Oasis version, appearing 40 seconds after the start of the Innes version.

Live performances

"Whatever" had been performed live by Oasis many times, sometimes with the string arrangement which accompanies the single version, sometimes without. They often ended live versions of the song with lyrics adapted from The Beatles song "Octopus's Garden". They had also been known to add the lines "All the young blues ....carry the news...," in reference to the Mott the Hoople (originally written by David Bowie) song "All the Young Dudes", with the changing of "dudes" to "Blues" being in reference to the then nickname of Man City. At their famous performances at Knebworth in August 1996, the song was accompanied throughout by harmonica player Mark Feltham.

Noel Gallagher later revisited "Whatever," adding the song to his setlist during his first tour with his band High Flying Birds.

B-sides
One of the single's B-sides, "Slide Away", was already featured on their debut album, Definitely Maybe. The other two — "(It's Good) to Be Free" and "Half the World Away" — were later featured on the B-side compilation The Masterplan. "Slide Away" and "Half the World Away" would also be featured on Oasis' 2006 compilation album Stop the Clocks, but "Whatever" itself was not included. "Half the World Away" was chosen as the theme tune to The Royle Family. "(It's Good) to Be Free" has been mentioned by Liam under the name "Live by the Sea", before its official release.

Track listings
All tracks are written by Noel Gallagher.

UK and European single (CD)
"Whatever" – 6:21
"(It's Good) to Be Free" – 4:18
"Half the World Away" – 4:25
"Slide Away" – 6:31

 European promo (CD)
"Whatever" (radio edit) – 3:58
"Whatever" (album version) – 6:20

 UK single (12")
"Whatever" – 6:21
"(It's Good) to Be Free" – 4:18
"Slide Away" – 6:31

 UK single (cassette, 7")
 French single (CD, 7")
"Whatever" – 6:20
"(It's Good) to Be Free" – 4:19

 Australian promo (CD) and single (cassette)
"Whatever" – 6:21
"(It's Good) to Be Free" – 4:18
"Half the World Away" – 4:25

 Japanese EP (CD)
"Whatever" – 6:20
"(It's Good) to Be Free" – 4:21
"Fade Away" – 4:14
"Listen Up" – 6:40
"Half the World Away" – 4:23
"I Am the Walrus" (live at Glasgow Cathouse, June '94) – 8:16

Charts

Weekly charts

Year-end charts

Certifications

Notes

References

1994 singles
1994 songs
Creation Records singles
Epic Records singles
Oasis (band) songs
Songs involved in plagiarism controversies
Songs written by Noel Gallagher
Songs written by Neil Innes